Caroline Cruice Goodall (born 13 November 1959) is a British actress and screenwriter. She was nominated for AFI Awards for her roles in the 1989 miniseries Cassidy, and the 1995 film Hotel Sorrento. Her other film appearances include Hook (1991), Cliffhanger (1993), Schindler's List (1993), Disclosure (1994), White Squall (1996), The Princess Diaries (2001) and The Best of Me (2014).

Early life
Goodall was born in London to a publisher father and journalist mother. She attended St Leonards-Mayfield School and graduated (1981) with a Bachelor of Arts in Drama and English from Bristol University. Caroline was a member of National Youth Theatre.

Career
Goodall has appeared extensively on stage, joining the Royal Shakespeare Company (RSC) and then the National Theatre. Her roles for the RSC include Lady Anne in Richard III, Australian tour opposite Sir Anthony Sher and Hypatia in Misalliance; while for the National Theatre she played Rebecca in Command or Promise. She  played Juliet in Romeo and Juliet at the Shaw Theatre, Viola In Twelfth Night ( Plymouth) starred at the Manchester Royal Exchange, Royal Court Theatre as Susan in Jonathan Gem's comedy Susan's Breasts; Alan Ayckbourn's Steven Joseph Theatre in Scarborough and as Isobel in David Hare's US premiere of The Secret Rapture at the SCR.

Goodall was chosen by Steven Spielberg to star in his 1991 film Hook. She went on to star as the villainess Kristel in the film Cliffhanger (1993), as Emilie Schindler in Schindler's List (1993), and  opposite Michael Douglas in Barry Levinson's Disclosure (1994). In Australia,  she co-starred with Russell Crowe in The Silver Brumby in 1993, and was nominated for the AFI Award for Best Actress for the 1995 film Hotel Sorrento. She had previously been nominated for the AFI Award for Best Actress in a TV film or miniseries for the 1989 miniseries Cassidy. In 1996, she starred with Pauline Quirke in the BBC miniseries The Sculptress. In 1998, she was nominated for a Logie Award for Best Actress for A Difficult Woman, which also won best TV mini series at the New York Festival in 1998. She starred opposite Jeff Bridges in Ridley Scott's White Squall (1996); as Helen Thermopolis in Garry Marshall's wildly successful The Princess Diaries (2001), The Princess Diaries 2: Royal Engagement (2004) and opposite Bruce Willis and Henry Cavill in The Cold Light Of Day (2012). European credits include starring in Urs Egger's Opernball (1998) The Thief Lord (2006), and Denis De La Patelliere's Épées Des Diamants.  She appeared in Lars von Trier's Nymphomaniac Vol. II (2013) and won a RIFF Best Actress Award for her role in Massimo Cogliatore's two-hander thriller The Elevator (2014). In 2015, she played Elsbeth Beaumont in Jocelyn Moorhouse's multi-award-winning film The Dressmaker, with Kate Winslet and Judy Davis.

As a screenwriter, in addition to The Bay of Silence, Goodall's credits include screen adaptations of Rupert Thomson's Dreams of Leaving for HKM Films.

Goodall has starred in many TV series including The White Queen (2013) and its sequel The White Princess (2017), portraying Cecily Neville, Duchess of York, the mother of kings Edward IV and Richard III. In 2016, she portrayed Kelly Frost in the CIA spy-thriller TV series Berlin Station.

Personal life
Goodall married Nicola Pecorini on 17 September 1994. The couple have two children, Gemma and Leone. Her sister is producer Victoria Goodall.

Filmography

Film

Television

References

External links
 

1959 births
Living people
People educated at St Leonards-Mayfield School
Alumni of the University of Bristol
Actresses from London
English film actresses
English stage actresses
English television actresses
English screenwriters
British women screenwriters
20th-century English actresses
21st-century English actresses
National Youth Theatre members